Whitfield Lovell (born October 2, 1959) is a contemporary African-American artist who is known primarily for his drawings of African-American individuals from the first half of the 20th century. Lovell creates these drawings in pencil, oil stick, or charcoal on paper, wood, or directly on walls. In his most recent work, these drawings are paired with found objects that Lovell collects at flea markets and antique shops.

Early career
Born October 2, 1959 in the Bronx, New York to Gladys Glover Lovell, an elementary school teacher from South Carolina, and Allister Lovell, a postal clerk and photographer of West Indian descent. Whitfield Lovell grew up in the Bronx and attended The High School of Music and Art in Manhattan. During high school, he also participated in a variety of extracurricular art programs: the Metropolitan Museum of Art High School Program, the Whitney Museum Art Resources Center, the New York State Summer School for the Arts in Fredonia, New York, and the Cooper Union Saturday Program.

In 1977, Lovell traveled to Spain to study painting and sculpture with Manhattanville College. At El Museo del Prado in Madrid, Spain, he decided that he would become a painter. Lovell has said:

Lovell spent a year at Maryland Institute College of Art (MICA), Baltimore in 1977 before traveling in France, Germany, Italy, England, Austria and the Netherlands with the American Institute For Foreign Study in 1978. When he returned to New York, he enrolled in the Fine Arts Department of the Parsons School of Design and then The Cooper Union School of Art, from which he graduated in 1981. In 1982, Lovell traveled to Egypt, Nigeria, and the Republic of Benin, West Africa.

In 1985, Lovell attended the Skowhegan School of Painting and Sculpture, where he reconsidered the nature of his own work:

This practice, using old photographs as inspiration and source material, has stayed with Whitfield to this day.

In 1986, Lovell stayed with relatives in Barbados, West Indies. In 1989, he attended New York University (NYU) Graduate Program in Venice, Italy. In 1990, he traveled to Mexico, where he began collecting ex-votos and retablos, which he cited as influences in his work.

In 1994, Lovell's work was shown as part of the American contingent at the IV Bienal Internacional de Pintura en Cuenca, Ecuador. Other American artists exhibiting at this show were Donald Locke, Philemona Williamson, Freddy Rodríguez and Emilio Cruz.

Installations
In 1993, Lovell visited a private artist's retreat at the Villa Val Lemme in Capriatta d'Orba, Italy. The villa had been built by a slave trader in the early 20th century.

In response, Lovell created site-specific drawings on the walls of the villa using its history as the theme, a dignified image of a black person. This was Lovell's first installation piece.

In 1995, while an artist in residence at Rice University in Houston, Texas, Lovell created his second installation. The piece, entitled Echo, was at Project Row Houses, a venue comprising abandoned "shot gun" houses in which artists create installations. Of the project, Lovell has said: "Villa Val Lemme was the first time I worked directly on the wall. At the time I wanted to explore installation further but wanted the right circumstances to arise. When I was approached to do a rowhouse it was just the right time. The feeling in the house was ideal for trying new ideas related to my interest in old photographs of "anonymous" people."

Whispers From the Walls was Lovell's fourth installation, created during a 1999 residency at the University of North Texas Art Gallery in Denton. Lovell created a rectangular house of salvaged boards with multicolored peeling paint. He covered the floors with soil and old clothing through which gallery visitors walked. Inside the house was a single room filled with furniture, clothing, personal objects, and sound. On the interior walls, life-size charcoal drawings suggested human residents. This exhibition appeared the Seattle Art Museum and the Studio Museum in Harlem on tour.

Portrayals, which originated at the Neuberger Museum in Purchase, NY, in the spring of 2000, included nineteen tableaux.

Visitation: The Richmond Project focused on Richmond, Virginia's historically African-American district Jackson Ward, "the nation's first major black entrepreneurial community." It traveled to the University of Wyoming, Laramie; the Columbus Museum Uptown, Georgia; and the Museum of Contemporary Art in Sydney, Australia, in 2004.

SANCTUARY: The Great Dismal Swamp originated at the Contemporary Art Center of Virginia. It was inspired by accounts of runaway slaves who hid in or escaped through the 2,200-square mile Great Dismal Swamp. Of the project, Lovell has said:

"The main inspiration for Sanctuary: The Great Dismal Swamp, aside from the readings and research I did, was visiting the swamp itself. The people at the Dismal Swamp Wildlife Refuge hosted me for a day of hikes and a boat ride across Lake Drummond, which is in the center of the swamp. Lake Drummond is an egg-shaped pond about three miles across and no deeper than six feet at its center. It was referred to by Irish poet John O'Reilly as 'the most wonderful and beautiful sheet of water on the continent.' The water is a rich brown color, like tea, the result of the tannin that dripped from the juniper trees over the centuries. That was the inspiration for the pool of water that became the centerpiece for the installation.

"Most important for me were the moments when I stood silently in the swamp and just listened to the sounds and felt the ambience."

"For the installation we got thirty trees and stood them up in the gallery, with branches, leaves, and vines extending into the space, creating barriers and obstacles for the viewer. The floor was covered with  mulch, and there were sounds of crickets, cicadas, and barking hounds throughout. Twelve basins and washboards filled with water were placed around the room, with the faces of people looking out at the viewer. Many of the images and objects that implied human inhabitants and the shingle industry were submerged in water. Somehow the legacy of those who lived hidden in the swamp to avoid slavery seemed to have been nearly lost, buried under that lake."

Tableaux

In 1997, during a month in Mount Desert, Maine, at the Acadia Summer Art Program, Lovell made his first tableaux: charcoal drawings on antique wood panels coupled with found objects.

Kin Series

The Kin Series (2008 - 2011) is collection of sixty works made of individual portrait images in Conte crayon on paper combined with found objects. The objects sometimes overlap with the image and cast shadows. The drawing and object are then framed in glass and black metal.

The series began with a drawing based on a photo-booth photograph of a young boy. Lovell says: "There was something about that young boy's face that captivated me. His eyes and mouth were so expressive, as if he were about to cry. I felt compelled to try and capture that emotional quality."

For this series, Lovell's photographic sources differ from his vintage studio shots. Instead, he uses mug shots, passport photos, and photobooth images. Lovell has described the difference in using these photographs as sources: "Once the Kin Series got going, I noticed a major difference in the drawings. The difference was the people were more harshly lit, not made up, and the photos were untouched and there was often a reluctance in their expressions. I saw those qualities as more honest and raw (if I may), whereas in the studio portrait photos that I have worked from, the sitters appear very elegant and posed. Those people were very invested in how they presented themselves. They chose the day, the clothes, the photographer, etc."

Collecting

Lovell's Tableaux and Kin Series include an abundance of antique objects that are symptomatic of Lovell's love of collecting. Lovell has said: "I began collecting hands after I had already been using hands in my work. The more I learned about the iconography of hands, the more excited I was to continue with the theme. Also, my interest in collecting crayon portraits came simultaneously with the images in the Hand Series, thought I didn't consciously think about it at the time ... There has always been a reason for my wanting to own certain objects more than others. I've tried to be a focused collector, so that I was spending my money on things that fed the work."

Awards

 1982 Jerome Foundation Fellowship to the Robert Blackburn Printmaking Workshop
 1985 Eastman Scholarship to the Skowhegan School of Painting and Sculpture
 1986 Robert Blackburn Printmaking Workshop Fellowship
 1986 New York State Council on the Arts Grant						
 1987 New York State Council on the Arts Grant
 1988 Mousem D'Asilah Residency, Asilah, Morocco
 1990 Promise of Learnings Inc. Award for Excellence in Education
 1990 Metropolitan Transportation Authority, Arts for Transit Poster Commission		
 1990 Penny McCall Foundation Grant							
 1990 Artists Homeless Shelter Collaborative Grant
 2001 Art Awareness Residency, Lexington, NY			
 2002 Virginia Museum of Contemporary Art, Virginia Beach, VA, Artist in Residence
 2003 Richard C. Diebenkorn Fellowship, San Francisco Art Institute, California
 2007 Emil & Dines Carlsen Award, National Academy Museum
 2007 MacArthur Fellows Program, Chicago, Illinois
 2009 Malvina Hoffman Artists Fund Prize, 184th Annual Exhibition of Contemporary American Art, National Academy Museum, New York, New York
 2009 Nancy Graves Grant for Visual Artists, The Nancy Graves Foundation, New York, New York
2014 National Academy Award for Excellence, New York, New York

Collections
Lovell's work is held in the following permanent collections, among others:
 Baltimore Museum of Art, Baltimore, Maryland
Brooklyn Museum Brooklyn, New York
 Columbus Museum of Art, Columbus, Ohio
 Corcoran Gallery of Art, Washington, DC
 Cornell Fine Arts Museum, Winter Park, Florida
Cummer Museum, Jacksonville, Florida
High Museum of Art, Atlanta, Georgia
 Metropolitan Museum of Art, New York City, New York
Museum of Modern Art (MoMA), New York City, New York
National Gallery of Art, Washington, D.C.
National Museum of African American History and Culture, Smithsonian, Washington, D.C.
Neuberger Museum of Art, Purchase, New York
New Orleans Museum of Art, New Orleans, Louisiana
Pennsylvania Academy of the Fine Arts, Philadelphia, Pennsylvania
The Phillips Collection, Washington, D.C.
Seattle Art Museum, Seattle, Washington
 Smithsonian American Art Museum, Washington, D.C.
Studio Museum in Harlem, New York, New York
 Whitney Museum of American Art, New York, New York
 Williams College Museum of Art, Williamstown, Massachusetts
 Yale University Art Gallery, New Haven, Connecticut

Solo exhibitions
 1982 Interchurch Center, New York, New York
 1984 Galeria Morivivi, New York, New York
 1985 John Jay College, New York, New York
 1987 Harlem School of the Arts, New York, New York
 1988 Jersey City Museum, Jersey City, NJ
 1993 Lehman College Art Gallery, New York, New York
 1997 Southeastern Center for Contemporary Art, Winston-Salem, NC
 1997 DC Moore Gallery, New York, New York
 1998 Collecting Inspiration, The Andy Warhol Museum, Pittsburgh, PA
 1999-2005 Whispers From the Walls - An Installation by Whitfield Lovell, University of North Texas Art Gallery, Denton, TX (traveled to: Texas Fine Art Association, The Jones Center for Contemporary Art, Austin, TX; Seattle Art Museum, Seattle, WA; The Studio Museum in Harlem, New York, NY; Robeson Art Gallery, Rutgers, State University of New Jersey, Newark, NJ; Virginia Museum of Contemporary Art, Virginia Beach, VA; Texarkana Regional Arts & Humanities Council, Texarkana, TX; Montgomery Museum of Fine Arts, Montgomery, AL; Public Library of Charlotte & Mecklenburg County, Charlotte, NC; California African American Museum, Los Angeles, CA; Reed College, Portland, OR; National Civil Rights Museum, Memphis, TN; San Antonio Museum of Art, TX; Louisiana State University, Union Art Gallery, LA; Stedman Art Gallery, Rutgers-Camden, NJ; Arkansas Arts Center, Little Rock, AR; Dane G. Hansen Memorial Museum, Logan, KS)
 2000 Recent Tableaux, DC Moore Gallery, New York, New York
 2000–02 Portrayals, Neuberger Museum of Art, State University of New York, Purchase, NY (traveled to: Montclair Art Museum, Montclair, NJ; Tubman African-American Museum, Macon, GA; Evansville Museum of Art, Evansville, IN)
 2001 Beyond the Frame: Whitfield Lovell, Knoxville Museum of Art, Knoxville, TN	
 2001 Embers, Boston University Art Gallery, Boston, MA
 2001 Whitfield Lovell, Recent Tableaux, Black History Museum & Cultural Center of Virginia, Richmond, VA
 2001–04 Visitation: The Richmond Project, Hand Workshop Art Center, Richmond, VA (traveled to: University of Wyoming Art Museum, Laramie, WY; The Columbus Museum, Columbus, GA; Museum of Contemporary Art, Sydney, Australia)
 2002 SANCTUARY: The Great Dismal Swamp, An Installation by Whitfield Lovell, Virginia Museum of Contemporary Art, Virginia Beach, VA	
 2002 Whitfield Lovell: Memories, Thomasville Cultural Center, Thomasville, GA (traveled to: Albany Museum of Art, Albany, GA)
 2002 Whitfield Lovell: Embers, DC Moore Gallery, New York, New York
 2003 Whitfield Lovell: Tableaux, Art Museum of Southeast Texas, Beaumont, TX
 2003 GRACE: A Project by Whitfield Lovell, Bronx Museum of the Arts, Bronx, New York
 2003 Whitfield Lovell: Ancestors, Flint Institute of Arts, MI
 2003 That You Know Who We Are: Works by Whitfield Lovell, Zora Neale Hurston National Museum of Fine Arts, Eatonville, FL
 2004 Whitfield Lovell, Arthur Roger Gallery, New Orleans, LA
 2004 Whitfield Lovell: Tableaux, Olin Art Gallery, Kenyon College, Gambier, OH
 2005 Whitfield Lovell: Homegoing, John Michael Kohler Arts Center, Sheboygan, WI
 2006 Whitfield Lovell, DC Moore Gallery, New York, New York
 2008 Whitfield Lovell: All Things in Time, Hudson River Museum, Yonkers, New York
 2008 Whitfield Lovell: Kith & Kin, DC Moore Gallery, New York, New York
 2009 Whitfield Lovell: Distant Relations, Berrie Center for Performing and Visual Arts, Ramapo College of New Jersey, Mahwah, NJ
 2009 Mercy, Patience and Destiny: The Women of Whitfield Lovell's Tableaux, Atlanta College of Art Gallery of Savannah College of Art and Design, Woodruff Arts Center, Atlanta, GA
 2009 Whitfield Lovell: One Man's Treasures, Hampton University Museum, Hampton, VA
 2010 Whitfield Lovell, Arthur Roger Gallery, New Orleans, LA
 2011 More Than You Know: Works By Whitfield Lovell, Smith College Museum of Art, Northampton, MA
 2013 Whitfield Lovell: Deep River, Hunter Museum of American Art, Chattanooga, TN
 2015 Whitfield Lovell: Deep River, Telfair Museums, Savannah, GA
 2015 Whitfield Lovell: Deep River, The Cummer Museum of Art & Gardens, Jacksonville, FL
 2016 Whitfield Lovell: The Kin Series and Related Works", The Phillips Collection, Washington, DC
 2017 Inbox: Whitfield Lovell, The Museum of Modern Art, New York, NY (March 25–May 26, 2017)

Bibliography
"Whitfield Lovell", Tom Otterness, BOMB, 91/Spring 2005
Bartholomew F. Bland, Whitfield Lovell, Whitfield Lovell: all things in time, Hudson River Museum, 2008, 
Lucy R. Lippard, Carla Hanzal, Leslie King-Hammond, and Jennifer Ellen Way. The Art of Whitfield Lovell: Whispers from the Walls, Pomegranate, 2003,

Books and exhibition catalogues
 1983 Rosner-Jeria, Elaine, and William Jung. Trans-Fers (exhibition catalogue). New York: Henry Street Settlement and El Grupo Morivivi, 1983.
 1983 Bickimer, David A. Christ the Placenta, Notes to My Mentor on Religious Education. Birmingham: Religious Education Press, 1983.
 1984 Artist in the Marketplace (exhibition catalogue). Bronx, NY: The Bronx Museum of the Arts, 1984.
 1986 Verre, Philip. Curator's Choice II (exhibition catalogue). Bronx, NY: Bronx Museum of the Arts, 1986.	
 1986 Black Visions '86 (exhibition catalogue). New York: Tweed Gallery, 1986.
 1987 Bibby, Diedre. Who's Uptown: Harlem '87 (exhibition catalogue). New York: Schomburg Center for Research in Black Culture, 1987.
 1988 Other Countries: Gay Black Voices, New York, NY: Cultural Council Foundation/Management and Resources for the Arts, 1988.
 1988 Jones, Kellie. New Visions: James Little, Whitfield Lovell, Alison Saar (exhibition catalogue). Queens, NY: The Queens Museum, 1988.
 1989 Smith, Valerie. Selections from the Artists File, Artists Space (exhibition catalogue). New York: Artists Space, 1989.
 1990 Stanislaus, Grace. New Perspectives: Colin Chase and Whitfield Lovell (exhibition catalogue). Miami: Miami Dade College, Wolfson Gallery, 1990.
 1990 Georgia, Olivia. Family Stories (exhibition catalogue). Staten Island, NY: Snug Harbor Cultural Center, 1990.
 1991 Long, Richard, and Judith Wilson. African-American Works on Paper from the Cochran Collection (exhibition catalogue). Atlanta: Double Density, 1991.
 1991 Jones, Kellie, and Thomas W. Sokolowski. Interrogating Identity (exhibition catalogue). New York: Grey Art Gallery and Study Center, 1991.
 1991 Bellamy, Peter. The Artist Project, Portraits of the Real Word/New York Artists 1981–1990. New York: IN Publishing, 1991.
 1993 Yau, John. The Bronx Celebrates Whitfield Lovell (exhibition catalogue). Bronx, NY: Lehman College Art Gallery, 1993.
 1993 Hazlewood, Carl. Current Identities, Recent Painting in the United States (exhibition catalogue). Newark, NJ: Aljira Center for Contemporary Art, 1993.
 1994 Henning, Roni. Screen Printing: Water Based Techniques, Non-Toxic Methods for a Safe Environment. New York: Watson Guptill Publications, 1994.	
 1994 Balka, Sigmund R. Empowerment: The Art of African American Artists (exhibition catalogue). White Plains, NY: Krasdale Gallery, 1994.
 1995 Yau, John. Murder (exhibition catalogue). Santa Monica: Smart Art Press, 1995.
 1995 de Larrazabel, Eudoxia Estrella. IV Bienal International de Pintura, Cuenca, Ecuador (exhibition catalogue). Cuenca, Ecuador, 1995.
 1996 Wolfe, Townsend. National Drawing Invitational (exhibition catalogue). Little Rock: Arkansas Arts Center, 1996.
 1996 Chin, Mel. Scratch (exhibition catalogue). New York: Thread Waxing Space, 1996.
 1996 Cappellazzo, Amy. Real (exhibition catalogue). Miami: Bass Museum of Art, 1996.
 1997 Llanes, Llilian. Sexta Bienal de la Habana, El Individuo y Su Memoria (exhibition catalogue). Havana, Cuba: Centro Wifredo Lam, 1997.
 1998 Taha, Halima M. Collecting African American Art: Works on Paper and Canvas. New York: Crown Publishers, 1998.
 1999 Lippard, Lucy, and Jennifer Ellen Way. The Art of Whitfield Lovell, Whispers From the Walls (exhibition catalogue). Denton, TX: University of North Texas Press, 1999.
 1999 Hertz, Betti-Sue. Urban Mythologies: The Bronx Represented Since the 1960s (exhibition catalogue). Bronx, NY: Bronx Museum of the Arts, 1999.
 2000 Wei, Lilly. Portrayals (exhibition catalogue). Purchase, NY: The Neuberger Museum of Art, 2000.
 2000 20 Years of Artists in the Marketplace Program (CD-ROM). Bronx, NY: The Bronx Museum of the Arts, 2000.
 2000 Hills, Patricia. Recent Tableaux (exhibition catalogue). New York, NY: DC Moore Gallery, 2000.
 2000 Foster, Carter E., and Stephen F. F. Jost. Drawing on Language (exhibition catalogue). Cleveland: SPACES Gallery, 2000.
 2000 DC Moore Gallery. Whitfield Lovell: Portrayals (exhibition catalogue).
 2001 Wolfe, Townsend. About Face: Collection of Jackye and Curtis Finch, Jr. (exhibition catalogue). Little Rock: Arkansas Arts Center, 2001: 62, illus.	
 2001 Selections: Painting (exhibition catalogue). Oakdale, NY: Dowling College, 2001.
 2001 Makrandi, Nandini. Beyond the Frame: Whitfield Lovell (exhibition brochure).  Knoxville: Knoxville Museum of Art, 2001.
 2001 Kushner, Robert. Beauty Without Regret (exhibition catalogue). Santa Fe: Bellas Artes Gallery, 2001.
 2001 Fairbrother, Trevor. "Going Forward, Looking Back," in Words of Wisdom: A Curator's Vade Mecum on Contemporary Art, New York: Independent Curators International, 2001: 56-58.
 2002 Smagula, Howard J. Creative Drawing, London, England: Lawrence King Publishing, 2002: 15, 133.	
 2002 Nahas, Dominique. Whitfield Lovell: Embers (exhibition catalogue). New York: DC Moore Gallery, 2002.
 2002 Hanzal, Carla. SANCTUARY: The Great Dismal Swamp, An Installation by Whitfield Lovell (exhibition booklet). Virginia Beach: Contemporary Art Center of Virginia, 2002.
 2003 Lippard, Lucy R., Carla Hanzal, Leslie King-Hammond, and Jennifer Ellen Way. The Art of Whitfield Lovell: Whispers from the Walls, 2nd edn, San Francisco: Pomegranate, 2003.
 2003 Lapcek, Barbara. "Whitfield Lovell: Visual Artist," in Hatch-Billops Collections, Inc.: Artist & Influence, Vol. XXI, New York: Hatch-Billops Collection, 2003: 175-192.
 2003 Gerdts, William H. et al. American Art at the Flint Institute of Arts, Flint, MI: Flint Institute of Arts, 2003: 260-261.
 2003 Everett, Gwen. African American Masters: Highlights from the Smithsonian American Art Museum. New York: Harry N. Abrams; Washington, DC: Smithsonian American Art Museum, 2003. 				
 2003 Bessire, Mark H. C. Skowhegan 2002-2003 Faculty Exhibition (exhibition catalogue). Portland, ME: Institute of Contemporary Art, Maine College of Art, 2003.
 2004 Princenthal, Nancy et al. Whitfield Lovell, in +Witness (exhibition catalogue). Sydney: Museum of Contemporary Art, 2004: 42-49.
 2004 Brookman, Philip. Common Ground: Discovering Community in 150 Years of Art (exhibition catalogue). London: Merrell Publishers, 2004.
 2005 Yee, Lydia. Collection Remixed (exhibition catalogue). Bronx, NY: The Bronx Museum of the Arts, 2005: 54-55.
 2007 182nd Annual Exhibition of Contemporary American Art (exhibition catalogue). New York: National Academy Museum, 2007: illus. 133.
 2007 Reynolds, Jock. Art For Yale: Collecting for a New Century (exhibition catalogue). New Haven, CT: Yale University Art Gallery, 2007: illus. 334.
 2008 Conrad, Dr. Derek Conrad. The Other Mainstream II: Selections from the Collection of Mikki and Stanley Weithorn (exhibition catalogue). Tempe, AZ: Arizona State University Art Museum, 2008: illus. 31.	
 2008 Heartney, Eleanor. Art and Today, New York: Phaidon Press, 2008: illus. 412.
 2008 Sims, Lowery Stokes. Whitfield Lovell: All Things in Time, Yonkers, NY: Hudson River Museum, 2008.
 2009 Lewis, Sarah. Mercy, Patience and Destiny: The Women of Whitfield Lovell's Tableaux (exhibition catalogue). Atlanta: The ACA Gallery of SCAD, 2009.
 2009 Kim, Linda. "Distant Relations: Identity and Estrangement in Whitfield Lovell's Kin Series," in Distant Relations (exhibition catalogue). Mahwah, NJ: Ramapo College, 2009.
 2009 Carson, Charles D. and Julie L. McGee. Sound:Print:Record: African American Legacies (exhibition catalogue). Newark, DE: University Museums, University of Delaware, 2009: illus. cover, 46.
 2010 United States Mission to the United Nations, New York: ART in Embassies Exhibition (exhibition catalog), Washington, DC: Art in Embassies, 2010.
 2010 Franks, Pamela and Robert E. Steele. Embodied: Black Identities in American Art from the Yale University Art Gallery (exhibition catalog). New Haven, CT: Yale University Art Gallery, 2010: illus. 45.
 2010 Griffin, Farah Jasmine. "Whitfield Lovell", in RE: COLLECTION, Selected Works from The Studio Museum in Harlem, New York: The Studio Museum in Harlem, 2010.

References

External links
DC Moore Gallery: Whitfield Lovell
Whitfield Lovell on Artnet
MacArthur Foundation: Whitfield Lovell
Brooklyn Rail: Kith and Kin review
Art in America, September 2006, "Whitfield Lovell at DC Moore".  http://images.dcmooregallery.com/www_dcmooregallery_com/Lovell_ArtInAmerica2006.jpg
Nka: Journal of Contemporary African Art, "Whitfield Lovell: Autour Du Monde" http://www.dcmooregallery.com/artists/whitfield-lovell

1959 births
American installation artists
Artists from the Bronx
Cooper Union alumni
MacArthur Fellows
African-American contemporary artists
American contemporary artists
Living people
The High School of Music & Art alumni
Maryland Institute College of Art alumni
Parsons School of Design alumni
African-American painters